The 2017 UNCAF Women's Interclub Championship was the second edition of the UNCAF Women's Club Championship, Central America's premier women's club football organized by UNCAF. The tournament was played in Managua, Nicaragua between 4 and 9 September 2017.

In the final, Moravia from Costa Rica defeated UNAN Managua from Nicaragua to win their second consecutive title. All games were 80 minutes in duration.

Teams
A total of six teams from five of the seven UNCAF associations entered the tournament.

Venues
All matches were played at the Nicaragua National Football Stadium in Managua.

Group stage
The six teams were divided into two groups of three. The group winners and runners-up advanced to the semi-finals.

All times were local, CST (UTC−6).

Group A

Group B

Knockout stage

Bracket

Semi-finals

Third place match

Final

Top goalscorers

Awards

References

External links
Fútbol Femenino – Torneo Interclubes, UNCAFut.com

2017
2017 in women's association football
2017 in Central American football
2017 in Nicaraguan sport
September 2017 sports events in North America
International association football competitions hosted by Nicaragua